Roberto Suazo Córdova (17 March 1927 – 22 December 2018) was the President of Honduras from 1982 until 1986. Suazo Córdova died on 22 December 2018 following an ulcer surgical operation at the age of 91.

Presidency
In 1981, Suazo Córdova was the President of the National Constituent Assembly that drew up the 1982 Honduran Constitution. He won a clear majority as a member of the Liberal Party of Honduras and became president in January 1982. The Liberal victory surprised many who believed the armed forces would interfere in favor of its erstwhile National Party allies. Colonel Gustavo Álvarez Martínez became head of the armed forces. The Reagan administration put heavy pressure on Honduras to assist in U.S. efforts against the Nicaragua's Sandinistas and El Salvador's guerrillas operating in Honduras. A U.S
military spokesman neatly summarized the U.S. appraisal of the situation: "Honduras is the keystone to our policy down there". Suazo and Alvarez accepted U.S. troops on continuous "maneuvers", the construction and expansion of military bases and facilities, and even U.S. training of Salvadoran troops within Honduras. Honduras provided sanctuary and overt cooperation to the Contra army the United States was developing to attack Nicaragua's Sandinista government. Honduras thus became the active ally of the U.S. military strategy for Nicaragua and El Salvador.  The country was described at the time as an aircraft carrier—the "USS Honduras". In exchange, Honduras received hundreds of millions of dollars in U.S assistance—especially military aid.

References

1927 births
2018 deaths
People from La Paz Department (Honduras)
Presidents of Honduras
Universidad de San Carlos de Guatemala alumni
Liberal Party of Honduras politicians
Honduran Roman Catholics